Amar Ammour (born 10 September 1976) is am Algerian former professional footballer who played as a midfielder. He made three appearances for the Algeria national team.

Club career
Ammour was born in Aïn El Hadjel.

On 30 January 2011, Ammour left MC Alger to join CR Belouizdad, signing an 18-month contract with the club.

National team statistics

Honours
USM Alger
 Algerian league: 2003, 2005
 Algerian Cup: 2003, 2004

Individual
 Algerian Ballon d'Or (top Algerian football player): 2003

References

External links
 
 

1976 births
Living people
People from Aïn El Hadjel
Association football midfielders
Algerian footballers
Algeria international footballers
USM Alger players
MC Alger players
CA Bordj Bou Arréridj players
Algerian Ligue Professionnelle 1 players
Algeria A' international footballers
ASM Oran players
CR Belouizdad players
21st-century Algerian people